Lakeside is a suburb of Doncaster, South Yorkshire, England, centred around a circular lake. The area has settled vegetation, paths, bridges, notice boards and space for public gatherings around the lake.

It is split between the Town and Bessacarr and Cantley wards within the Metropolitan Borough of Doncaster. Lakeside borders Bessacarr to the east, Belle Vue to the north, Balby to the west, and Potteric Carr to the south.

Wildlife
Many species of bird and fish have established themselves here and the nearby Potteric Carr Nature Reserve, which offers bat, spider and other guided tours, has included this area in its extended walks about wildlife in the area.

Birds
Several species have been recorded here, including Gadwall,  Canada Geese,  Moorhens,  Cormorants,  mallard,  Tufted ducks, Northern Shovellers, Gulls, Coots, Great crested Grebe, Sand Martin, Temminck's Stint and Pochards. Raptors have also been seen here, including Osprey, Kestrel and Horned owl.

This lake is home to a flock of mute swans which have the gene for leucism.
  

In around 1800 some swans were brought in from Poland and were called Polish swans. At first, they were thought to be a new species, which was named  cygnus immutabilis. Compared to normal mute swans, these swans are whiter, and their legs are pinkish, not dark. Later, modern science discovered the variant in the swans' DNA and confirmed that it was not a new species but a different allele.

Bats
After sunset the resident bats show themselves. Pipistrelle, Noctule, Daubentons, Brandts and Natterers have been heard on walks around Lakeside.

Sports and recreation

A popular path for walkers, joggers and cyclists surrounds the lake. It follows the perimeter of the lake and is about 2 miles (3.5 kilometres) long. 

Annual water sports events take place here, to the irritation of nature lovers and interest groups.

Annual dragon boat racing has also been promoted. Various groups have used the lakeside track as cycling tours for their events.

Conservation

This area is monitored by the Lakeside Wildlife Action Group.

Other groups include Birdwatch, Swanwatch, Butterflywatch, Frogwatch, as well as walking and cycling groups. 

The Lakeside Wildlife Action Group recently erected informative notice boards, sponsored by a local accounting firm. Other notice boards feature walking/cycle path, location map, scan codes and walking trials and these boards are managed by Doncaster Metropoliton Borough council.

References

Geography of the Metropolitan Borough of Doncaster